The 1915 Swansea District by-election was held on 6 February 1915.  The by-election was held due to the incumbent Liberal MP, David Brynmor Jones, becoming a High Court Judge.  It was won by the Liberal candidate Thomas Jeremiah Williams  who was unopposed due to a War-time electoral pact.

References

1915 elections in the United Kingdom
1915 in Wales
1910s elections in Wales
20th century in Swansea
Elections in Swansea
By-elections to the Parliament of the United Kingdom in Welsh constituencies
Unopposed by-elections to the Parliament of the United Kingdom (need citation)